English Rugby Union Midland Division - Midlands 6 East (NW) is an English Rugby Union League.

Midlands 6 East (NW) is made up of teams from around the East Midlands of England who play home and away matches throughout a winter season. As with many low level they are often subject to re-structure

Promoted teams move up to Midlands 5 East (North).  Teams that are second place at the end of the season go into a play off with the second placed team in Midlands 6 East (NE).

2008-2009 Season

2007-2008 Season

2006-2007 Season

References

 Rugby First: To view previous seasons in the league, search for any club within that league then click on to club details followed by fixtures and then select the appropriate season.

See also

 English rugby union system

7